Australodraco muelleri is a species of beetles in the family Buprestidae, from New Guinea; it is the only species in the genus Australodraco.

References

External links
 

Buprestidae
Monotypic Buprestidae genera